Batuhan Karacakaya (born 5 February 1997) is a Turkish television actor.
Batuhan Karacakaya is best known as Dündar Bey in the Turkish historical TV Show Diriliş: Ertuğrul.

Karacakaya played "Bülent Ziyagil" in the television series Aşk-ı Memnu between 2008 and 2010.

Filmography 
2005 – Beşinci Boyut(Arif/Emre)
2005 – Büyük Buluşma (Tunç)
2007–2008 – Bıçak Sırtı (Murat Ertugrul)
2008–2010 – Aşk-ı Memnu (Bülent Ziyagil)
2009 – Dersimiz Atatürk (Mert)
2010 – Baymin Url (Arem)
2010 – Bekle Beni (Salih)
2010 – Aşk Tesadüfleri Sever (Özgür)
2011–2013 – Umutsuz Ev Kadınları (Mert) (Turkish version of Desperate Housewives) 
2011 - Sen de Gitme (Selim)
2012 – Uzun Hikâye (15-year-old Mustafa)
2016-2017 – Diriliş Ertuğrul (Dündar) (season 3 & 4)

Competitions

References

External links 
 

 Batuhan Karacakaya at the Sinema Turk

1997 births
Turkish male television actors
Male actors from Istanbul
Living people
Turkish male child actors